Senecio coronatus (Thunb.) Harv. aka the woolly grassland senecio is a plant in the family Asteraceae, endemic to and widespread in Southern Africa, occurring in the moister southern and eastern regions.  

It is perennial with large, leathery, broadly elliptic, erect leaves growing from a large, underground rootstock with a woolly covering. Up to 20 capitula are arranged in a terminal cluster, each with some 10 slender yellow ray florets.

Phytochemicals
This species is capable of concentrating the toxic element nickel in its leaves, a strategy which appears to be an effective deterrent against herbivory.

References

Senecio
Plants described in 1865